Luolavuori is a district in the Uittamo-Skanssi ward of the city of Turku, in Finland. It is located to the southeast of the city centre, and is mainly parkland. There is a large old people's home in Luolavuori.

The current population of Luolavuori is 4,477, and it is decreasing at an annual rate of 0.92%. 9.00% of the district's population are under 15 years old, while 36.48% are over 65. The district's linguistic makeup is 92.52% Finnish, 6.21% Swedish, and 1.27% other.

See also
 Districts of Turku
 Districts of Turku by population
 Cave of Luolavuori

Districts of Turku